Caladenia macrostylis, commonly known as the leaping spider orchid, is a species of orchid endemic to the south-west of Western Australia. It has a single, hairy leaf and up to three distinctive pale greenish-yellow and red flowers with a cluster of deep purplish calli in the centre of its labellum.

Description 
The edges of the labellum are curled under and have small, crowded, blunt teeth and the tip is curled under. Flowering occurs from August to early November.

Taxonomy and naming 
Caladenia macrostylis was first described in 1842 by Robert Fitzgerald and the description was published in Nuytsia.

Distribution and habitat 
The leaping spider orchid is found in the area between Albany and Bindoon in the Avon Wheatbelt, Jarrah Forest, Swan Coastal Plain and Warren biogeographic regions where it grows in forest, woodland and coastal scrub.

Conservation
Caladenia macrostylis is classified as "not threatened" by the Western Australian Government Department of Parks and Wildlife.

References 

macrostylis
Orchids of Western Australia
Endemic orchids of Australia
Plants described in 1842
Endemic flora of Western Australia